Endasys is a genus of ichneumon wasps in the family Ichneumonidae. There are more than 120 described species in Endasys.

See also
 List of Endasys species

References

External links

 

Parasitic wasps
Articles created by Qbugbot